Sponginticola is a monotypic genus of crustaceans belonging to the monotypic family Sponginticolidae. The only species is Sponginticola uncifera.

References

Siphonostomatoida
Copepod genera
Monotypic crustacean genera